Tatham is a locality in New South Wales, Australia in Richmond Valley Shire. The name Tatham is derived from Bundjalung Jadham, meaning "child".

Tatham was once a bustling village with a wharf, pub, butchers shop, post office and a number of schools. The post office building is still standing today as well as an historic Roman Catholic church.

References

Towns in New South Wales
Northern Rivers
Richmond Valley Council